Kifl may refer to:

 Al Kifl, a town in southern Iraq
 Dhul-Kifl, a person variously considered to be a Muslim prophet or righteous man
 , an archaic Arabic word meaning "double" or "duplicate"

Acronym

KIFL may refer to:

 Kangaroo Island Football League, an Australian football league
 Kent Invicta Football League, an English non-league football competition